Chandler Center for the Arts (CCA), is located in Chandler, Arizona and is jointly owned by the City of Chandler and the Chandler Unified School District. The Chandler Center for the Arts functions dually as the home theater for Chandler High School and the arts center for the City of Chandler. The Chandler Center for the Arts receives no direct appropriations for artistic programming. Any donations it receives must be applied only to the maintenance and operation of the actual building.

Capacity Chart

Galleries
The center's Exhibition Hall hosts free exhibits of visual arts in a variety of media and cultural origins.

The Vision Gallery is located in CCA, and features rotating displays by over 350 artists in such media as painting, watercolor, photography, mixed media, sculpture, ceramics, glass, textiles and metal.

History
The City of Chandler created the Chandler Cultural Foundation in 1989  in order to create programming finance development for Chandler Center of the Arts. As the programming entity of CCA, the Chandler Cultural Foundation presents quality programs that would not otherwise be available in the community.

References

 Arizona Commission on the Arts. “Past Winners.” https://web.archive.org/web/20090112202124/http://www.azarts.gov/govsarts/index.htm. (n.d.) 20 Jan. 2009
 City of Chandler. “Chandler Center for the Arts to Host Public Forums in Conjunction with Expansion Feasibility Study” http://www.chandleraz.gov/newsrelease.aspx?N_UID=981 . 11 Sept. 2007. 20 Jan. 2009.
 Cohn, Ari. :Chandler Center for the Arts getting face-lift” East Valley Tribune. 25 Dec 2008. Online.
 Branom, Mark. "Year-long renovation of arts center begins" East Valley Tribune. 24 April 2009. Online. http://www.eastvalleytribune.com/story/138334

Arizona culture
Arts centers in Arizona
Performing arts centers in Arizona
Buildings and structures in Chandler, Arizona
Tourist attractions in Maricopa County, Arizona
1989 establishments in Arizona